Maria Cristina Pacifici (born 5 August 1945) is a retired Italian freestyle swimmer. She was part of the 4 × 100 m relay team that finished seventh-eighth at the 1960 and 1964 Summer Olympics. In 1960 she also competed in the individual 100 m event, but failed to reach the final.

References

1945 births
Living people
Italian female swimmers
Olympic swimmers of Italy
Swimmers at the 1960 Summer Olympics
Swimmers at the 1964 Summer Olympics
Italian female freestyle swimmers